Trehörningen is Swedish for "The Triangle", or literally "The Three-Corner",
and can refer to many different geographical locations, including:
 Trehörningen (Sjödalen) - a lake in Huddinge Municipality, in the Sjödalen-Fullersta area.
 Trehörningen, Hanveden - a lake in Huddinge Municipality, in the Hanveden area.
 Trehörningen, Tyresta - a lake in Tyresjö Municipality, in Tyresta National Park

See also 
 Trekanten (disambiguation) ("The Three-Edge")